Ceará is a state in northeast Brazil.

Ceará may also refer to :

Sports 
 Ceará Sporting Club, a Brazilian football team based in the state of Ceará
 Ceará (footballer) (born 1980), Brazilian footballer

Vessels 
 Brazilian landing ship Ceará (C30), a ship of the Brazilian Navy
 Brazilian monitor Ceará, an Imperial Brazilian Navy Pará-class river monitor

Other
 North coast Portuguese, the Cearense dialect of Brazilian Portuguese
 Ceará gnateater (Conopophaga cearae), a passerine bird of the family Conopophagidae
 Ceara, a synonym of the moth genus Peoria (moth)

See also 
 Ceará-Mirim, a city in Rio Grande do Norte state, Brazil
 Ceará-Mirim River, a river of Rio Grande do Norte state
 Ciara (disambiguation)
 Chiara (disambiguation)